Jiangxigou Township (Mandarin: 江西沟镇) is a township in Gonghe County, Hainan Tibetan Autonomous Prefecture, Qinghai, China. In 2010, Jiangxigou Township had a total population of 6,116: 3,052 males and 3,064 females: 1,708 aged under 14, 4,130 aged between 15 and 65 and 278 aged over 65.

References 

Township-level divisions of Qinghai
Hainan Tibetan Autonomous Prefecture